Ze'ev Iviansky (1 December 1923 – 22 December 2022) was an Israeli political scientist, and a former lecturer at the department of General History and Russian Studies of the Hebrew University.

Iviansky was born on 1 December 1923. He was the author of the book Individual Terror, Theory and Practice (1977) and numerous articles on terrorism. He has also made significant contributions to 1905 - Revolution and Terror, 1988 (in Hebrew).

Iviansky was a member of Lehi.

Iviansky died on 22 December 2022, at the age of 99.

References

1923 births
2022 deaths
Israeli Jews
Israeli political scientists
Experts on terrorism
Russian studies scholars
Place of birth missing
Herzliya Hebrew Gymnasium alumni
Academic staff of the Hebrew University of Jerusalem
Lehi (militant group)